The 1956–57 Danish Cup was the 3rd installment of the Danish Cup, the highest football competition in Denmark.

Final

References

1956-57
1956–57 domestic association football cups
1956–57 in Danish football